Dima Rebus is a contemporary Russian artist. He creates paintings, installations, and sculptures, while exploring the process of chemical transformation of materials. He is well known as the founder of Underground Aquarellka Universe, which focuses on human behavioral biology and the evolution of everyday norms of its existence.

Biography 
Dima Rebus was born on June 2, 1988, in Naberezhnye Chelny, Soviet Union.
The early career path of the artist was associated with the rapid development of street art in the early 2010s. At the time, Rebus managed to balance his studies at Moscow Art and Industry Institute and his job as an editorial illustrator in the publishing houses of Esquire, Psychologies, GQ. He has also collaborated with such TV channels as National Geographic Channel (US), Canal + (France). For several years, he illustrated a column for the magazine Total Football. In 2012, he created illustrations for a children's book series "Andersen's Magic Riddle".
Dima’s first exhibition "The Schtick" was held in Moscow in 2011 at the Center for Creative Industries "Fabrika". In the spring of 2014, he took part in the exhibition "Casus Pacis/Motive for Peace" as a part of the parallel program of the "Manifesta 10" European Biennale of Contemporary Art. During this group exhibition, Russian and Ukrainian artists united to oppose the military conflict which took place in Ukraine at that time, so their works were dedicated to the early establishment of peaceful relations between Russia and Ukraine. In the summer of 2014, he presented the exhibition "Insomnia" at the 4th Moscow Biennale of Contemporary Art. And at the end of 2014, he organized a solo exhibition that took place in Brussels (Belgium) at YawnArt (Artwin Gallery).
In 2016, Rebus participated in the 5th International Biennale for Young Art, presenting his "Good Deal" project. Within this biennale he was provided with an opportunity to cover a full building at the Trekhgornaya manufactory to make it an object for street-art, so he ‘packed’ the facade of this building in painted polythene film.
In 2017, he was invited by Goethe-Institut (Berlin) to take part in an exhibition dedicated to the 100th anniversary of the October Revolution. Within the framework of the exhibition, Rebus presented his project "Life Goes On" that represented a wall made of several hundred oil barrels, with depicted faces on every barrel; thus, the whole installation embodied a revolutionary mob. 

The artist was a contestant at numerous international contemporary art fairs, including Art Central (Hong Kong), Art Dubai (Dubai), Blazar (Moscow), Cosmoscow (Moscow).
Rebus’ watercolor art pieces were represented on the albums’ covers of a Russian composer Mikhail Mishchenko. He also designed the cover art for Noize MC's tenth album,"Exit to City" in 2021.

Career 
Rebus is best known for his large-format watercolors created on the basis of chemical solutions that he developed on his own. Dima’s complex painting approach combines the aesthetics of abstract, cartoon, and realistic techniques. The overall stylistics of his works includes references to well-known scientific phenomena alongside involuntary mysticism, retaining a general state of suspense. Carefully designed compositions refer to the artist's fascination with the culture of computer gaming and early experiences of digital interactions. One of the main focuses of his artistic practice is aimed to develop issues of adaptive norms and the distinctive evolution of their settings in modern society

Selected personal exhibitions 
 2021 — "Insolation Norms", Smena, Kazan, Russia
 2019 — "Now Open", Artwin Gallery, London, England
 2016 — "Good Deal", within the framework of the 5th International Biennale for Young Art, Moscow, Russia
 2014 — "Insomnia", within the framework of the 4th Moscow Biennale of Contemporary Art, A. N. Scriabin State Memorial Museum, Moscow, Russia
 2014 — "Dima Rebus", Artwin Gallery/YawnArt, Brussels, Belgium
 2013 — "The End", Artwin Gallery, Moscow, Russia
 2012 — "The Schtick", Center for Creative Industries "Fabrika", Moscow, Russia

Biennale and selected collective exhibitions 
 2021 — "Sovrisk na potoke", Zaryadye Underground Museum, Moscow, Russia
 2020 – Center for Contemporary Art "Shining", Apatity, Russia
 2019 — "Urban Nation" Biennale, Berlin, Germany
 2019 — "Dima Rebus", Artwin Gallery/Art Central, Hong Kong, China
 2019 — "Recycle or die", GUM-Red-Line, Moscow, Russia
 2018 — "Mad House", Multimedia Art Museum, Moscow, Russia
 2018 — "Art Dubai", Dubai, United Arab Emirates
 2017 — "Brighter days are coming", Goethe Institute and Urban Nation Museum, Berlin, Germany
 2017 — "Russian Collectors Forum", Central House of Artists, Moscow, Russia
 2017 — "Fresh Layer", Arsenal Exhibition Hall, Nizhny Novgorod, Russia
 2017 — "Cosmoscow", Gostiny Dvor, Moscow, Russia
 2016 — "Panelki", Belyaevo Gallery, Moscow, Russia
 2014 — "Casus Pacis", within the framework of the parallel program "Manifesta 10", Museum of Street Art, Saint Petersburg, Russia
 2014 — "Insomnia", within the framework of the parallel program 4th Moscow Biennale of Contemporary Art, A. N. Scriabin State Memorial Museum, Moscow, Russia
 2011 – Oh Yeah Festival, Patagonia, Argentina

Press 
 Article Colossal
 Article "Artguide"
 Interview Beautiful Bizarre
 Article Nailed
 Article The Village
 Article GQ
 Article "Afisha"
 Article ARB
 Interview Trendymen
 Article Design You Trust
 Article on geo pro
 Article The Pure Magazine

References

1988 births
Living people
21st-century Russian male artists